Juan Manuel Rosado Mojarro (born 24 April 1974), commonly known as Iván Rosado, is a Spanish retired footballer who played as a striker.

Over five seasons, he amassed La Liga totals of 122 matches and 26 goals with Osasuna (six years in total). He represented four other teams during his 16-year professional career, starting in 1992 with Recreativo.

Club career
Rosado was born in Huelva, Andalusia. After starting playing for local Recreativo de Huelva in the third division he signed for two seasons with Rayo Vallecano in the second tier, promoting in his first year but scoring only twice in 20 league games in the process.

Rosado's most steady and fruitful period came with Pamplona's CA Osasuna: after being the team's top scorer in his first season with 11 goals, as they returned to La Liga after six years– whilst Recreativo were relegated – he repeated the feat the following campaign (at 14), helping the Navarrese barely avoid relegation and taking his tally in his first three top-flight seasons to 25 goals, in 100 appearances.

After an uneventful loan at Xerez CD, Rosado was released by Osasuna in September 2006. After nearly one year out of football, he moved to Málaga CF. He featured scarcely during his one-and-a-half season spell, as the club returned to the top division in 2008.

Rosado had a trial at UD Melilla in August 2008, but nothing came of it and he eventually retired from the game aged 34. In 11 years in the two major levels, he amassed totals of 239 matches and 54 goals.

References

External links

1974 births
Living people
Footballers from Huelva
Spanish footballers
Association football forwards
La Liga players
Segunda División players
Segunda División B players
Recreativo de Huelva players
Rayo Vallecano players
CA Osasuna players
Xerez CD footballers
Málaga CF players
Spanish football managers